"The Only Truth" is the seventh solo single by Paul Haig. It was released in the UK on Island Records and licensed through Les Disques Du Crepuscule.

The track was co-produced by New Order's Bernard Sumner and Donald Johnson from A Certain Ratio.  The B-side features a cover of Suicide's "Ghost Rider".  This was also used as a B-side to his previous single, "Big Blue World".

In mainland Europe, the single was released on Les Disques Du Crepuscule.

In 2006, indie artist gnac used the Belgian sleeve for the album, Twelve Sidelong Glances.  As with many sleeves on Les Disques Du Crepuscule, the artwork was designed by Beniot Hennebert.

Track listing 

 "The Only Truth"
 "The Only Truth" (Instrumental)
 "Ghost Rider"

References

1984 singles
Paul Haig songs
1984 songs
Songs written by Paul Haig